Park Town is a small residential area in central North Oxford, a suburb of Oxford, England. It was one of the earliest planned suburban developments in the area and most of the houses are Grade II listed.

History
Samuel Lipscomb Seckham (1827–1900) developed the houses in the main crescent in 1853–54, with Bath stone front elevations, and the west-facing crescent with an elevated pavement known as "The Terrace" in 1854–55. The Park Town Estate Company was formed in September 1857 through Seckham's efforts.

Many of the houses and gardens in Park Town were originally surrounded by ornamental iron railings. Those for the detached houses were removed for war use in the Second World War but some have been restored.

Location
Park Town includes two crescents of town houses, surrounding communal gardens and a number of larger villas.

To the west is Banbury Road with Canterbury Road on the opposite side and to the east is the Dragon School. St Anne's College has student accommodation here.

Television
Park Town and its distinctive architecture featured in the ITV television series Inspector Morse (episode: The Way Through The Woods).

Individual houses
Miss Sarah Angelina Acland (1849–1930), daughter of Sir Henry Wentworth Acland, lived for the latter part of her life and died at her home in (then No. 7) Park Town. Her interest in colour photography at the turn of the 20th century produced a number of significant early examples, which are held at the Museum of the History of Science in central Oxford.

5 Park Town, was the second home of the Central Labour College (1910–1911) before it moved to 11–13 Penywern Road, Earls Court, London.

Notable residents
Former residents include:

 Edmund Bowen FRS (1898–1980), chemist and Fellow of University College.
 Godfrey Rolles Driver CBE, FBA (1892–1975), orientalist and Fellow of Magdalen College.
 Professor Sir Michael Dummett (1925-2011), philosopher and anti-racism campaigner, All Souls College, New College, Wykeham Professor of Logic.
 Charles Sutherland Elton FRS (1900–1991), zoologist, ecologist and Fellow of Corpus Christi College.
 John Flemming (1941–2003), economist and Warden of Wadham College.
 James Clerk Maxwell Garnett CBE (1880–1958), educationist and Secretary of the League of Nations.
 Aung San Suu Kyi, Myanmar State Counsellor.
 Ian McEwan, Booker Prize winning novelist.
 William Richard Morfill (1834–1909), first Professor of Russian and Slavonic Languages at Oxford, lived at number 42 and is commemorated by a blue plaque
 Leonid Pasternak (1862–1945), Russian painter, spent the last six years of his life living with his daughter Lydia Pasternak Slater (1902–1989), chemist and poet, at no. 20. Leonid Pasternak was the father of Boris Pasternak, poet and author of Doctor Zhivago, but he remained in Russia until his death. Ann Pasternak Slater, academic and translator, is the daughter of Lydia Pasternak Slater.

References

Sources and further reading

External links
 

Areas of Oxford
History of Oxford
Parks and open spaces in Oxford
St Anne's College, Oxford
British companies established in 1857
1857 establishments in England
Crescents (architecture)
Houses completed in 1854
Houses completed in 1855
Grade II listed buildings in Oxford